Alfa Potowabawi (1 June 1979 – 3 March 2017) was a Togolese football striker. He later worked as a football agent.

Club career
He played for clubs in Ghana, Ivory Coast, Malaysia, and Vietnam.

International career
He was a Togo international, appearing once in a 2002 FIFA World Cup qualification match against Angola. He scored his only international goal in the match.

Death 
He was killed on 3 March 2017, in a traffic accident.

References

External links
 

1979 births
2017 deaths
Togolese footballers
Togolese expatriate footballers
Togo international footballers
Terengganu FC players
Association football forwards
Real Tamale United players
Ghana Premier League players
21st-century Togolese people
Road incident deaths in Togo